Lactarius zonarius is a member of the large milk-cap genus Lactarius in the order Russulales. It was first described in 1783, under the basionym Agaricus zonarius. A rare, poisonous fungus, it can be found in Europe and North America.

Description
The mushroom cap has a cream-yellow to cream-orange color, and measures from 4 to 16 cm. The mushroom's insides are white and fleshy, and produce a white latex when cut. The stem measures 2 to 5 centimeters in length, and between 1 and 2 cm in diameter.

See also
List of Lactarius species

References

External links

zonarius
Fungi described in 1783
Fungi of Europe